Gabriele Bernasconi (born 26 January 1986) is a Swiss football goalkeeper who currently plays for FC Chiasso.

External links
FC Chiasso profile

1986 births
Living people
Swiss men's footballers
Association football goalkeepers
FC Lugano players
AC Bellinzona players
FC Locarno players
FC Chiasso players